Sergei Prokofiev composed and compiled his Waltz Suite, Op. 110, during the Soviet Union's post-Great Patriotic War period of 1946–1947.

In creating this work for the concert hall, the composer drew upon waltzes previously written for three of his most recent works for the stage and screen: the opera War and Peace (completed circa 1943–1944 but not yet premiered at that time); the ballet Cinderella (stage premiere, 1945); and, lastly, his score to the 1943 Soviet film Lermontov by Albert Gendelshtein and Konstantin Paustovsky.

Movements
The Waltz Suite comprises six movements, or waltzes:
Since We Met, from War and Peace
In the Palace, from Cinderella 
Mephisto Waltz, from Lermontov
End of the Fairy Tale, from Cinderella 
New Year's Eve Ball, from War and Peace
Happiness, from Cinderella

Premiere
The work's premiere was conducted by the composer himself on 13 May 1947 in Moscow.

Recordings

Among recordings of the Waltz Suite released on compact disc are ones by:

Marin Alsop, conducting the São Paolo State Symphony Orchestra (Naxos)
Neeme Järvi, conducting the Scottish National Orchestra (Chandos)
Theodore Kuchar, conducting the National Symphony Orchestra of Ukraine (Naxos)
Gennady Rozhdestvensky, conducting the Moscow Radio Symphony Orchestra (Russian Revelation)
Hans Schwieger, conducting the Kansas City Philharmonic (Varèse Sarabande)
Alexander Titov, conducting the Saint Petersburg Philharmonic Orchestra (Beaux Authentics).

References

External links

Prokofiev
1947 compositions
Suites by Sergei Prokofiev